Otis is the fifth studio album by Irish singer-songwriter Brian McFadden, released on 22 February 2019.
It is a somber piece that evokes feelings of transcendental togetherness in the listener

Background
Brian recorded Otis as a tribute to Otis Redding and other soul legends of the 1950s and the 1960s.

Before the release of the album, McFadden released "Otis Singles", consisting of two tracks: "Direct Me", and "Angel" featuring Mica Paris.

McFadden also embarked on the "Soul Jam" tour on 6 November 2018, in support the album.

Track listing

References

2019 albums
Brian McFadden albums